Elbe-Elster – Oberspreewald-Lausitz II is an electoral constituency (German: Wahlkreis) represented in the Bundestag. It elects one member via first-past-the-post voting. Under the current constituency numbering system, it is designated as constituency 65. It is located in southern Brandenburg, comprising the districts of Elbe-Elster and Oberspreewald-Lausitz.

Elbe-Elster – Oberspreewald-Lausitz II was created for the 2002 federal election. Since 2021, it has been represented by Hannes Walter of the Social Democratic Party (SPD).

Geography
Elbe-Elster – Oberspreewald-Lausitz II is located in southern Brandenburg. As of the 2021 federal election, it comprises the Elbe-Elster district and the Oberspreewald-Lausitz district excluding the municipality of Lübbenau.

History
Elbe-Elster – Oberspreewald-Lausitz II was created in 2002 and contained parts of the abolished constituencies of Senftenberg – Calau – Spremberg and Bad Liebenwerda – Finsterwalde – Herzberg – Lübben – Luckau. In the 2002 and 2005 elections, it was constituency 65 in the numbering system. In the 2009 election, it was number 66. Since the 2013 election, it has been number 65. Its borders have not changed since its creation.

Members
The constituency was first represented by Stephan Hilsberg of the Social Democratic Party (SPD) from 2002 to 2009. Michael Stübgen of the Christian Democratic Union (CDU) was elected in the 2009 election, and re-elected in 2013 and 2017. He resigned in November 2019 after being appointed to the state government of Brandenburg. Hannes Walter regained the constituency for the SPD in 2021.

Election results

2021 election

2017 election

2013 election

2009 election

References

Federal electoral districts in Brandenburg
2002 establishments in Germany
Constituencies established in 2002